Thomas Hickersberger (born 21 August 1973) is a football coach and former player who is assistant manager at Rapid Wien. He made one appearance for the Austria national team in 2002.

Personal life
He is the son of manager Josef Hickersberger.

Honours
 Austrian First League: 1997–98

References

1973 births
Living people
Austrian footballers
Association football defenders
Austria international footballers
SK Vorwärts Steyr players
SW Bregenz players
FC Admira Wacker Mödling players
FC Red Bull Salzburg players
First Vienna FC players
Austrian football managers
Wiener Sport-Club managers